Daniel Scott may refer to:

 Daniel Scott (actor) (?–2014), Australian actor
 Daniel Scott (basketball) (born 1953), Cuban Olympic basketball player
 Daniel Scott (harbourmaster) (1800–1865), Fremantle harbourmaster, Chair of Fremantle Town
 Daniel Scott (writer) (born 1963), American fiction writer
 Daniel Scott (lexicographer) (1694–1759), English nonconformist minister, theological writer and lexicographer
 Daniel Scott (soccer) (born 1986), American soccer player
 Dan Scott, One Tree Hill character